Andrzej Konopka (1 September 1934 – 26 March 1999) was a Polish gymnast. He competed at the 1960 Summer Olympics and the 1964 Summer Olympics.

References

1934 births
1999 deaths
Polish male artistic gymnasts
Olympic gymnasts of Poland
Gymnasts at the 1960 Summer Olympics
Gymnasts at the 1964 Summer Olympics
People from Sandomierz
Sportspeople from Świętokrzyskie Voivodeship
20th-century Polish people